Amphilius lamani is a species of catfish in the genus Amphilius. It is found in the lower Congo River. Its length reaches 9.6 cm.

References

lamani
Freshwater fish of Central Africa
Fish described in 1920
Taxa named by Einar Lönnberg